Edward Turnour may refer to:

Edward Turnour (speaker) (1617–1676), Speaker of the House of Commons
Edward Turnour (died 1721) (1643–1721), son of the above, MP for Orford
Edward Turnour, 1st Earl Winterton (1734–1788), great-grandson of the above
Edward Turnour, 2nd Earl Winterton (1758–1831), son of the above
Edward Turnour, 3rd Earl Winterton (1784–1833), son of the above
Edward Turnour, 4th Earl Winterton (1810–1879), son of the above
Edward Turnour, 5th Earl Winterton (1837–1907), son of the above
Edward Turnour, 6th Earl Winterton (1883–1962), son of the above